Antônio André de Sá Filho, known as André Filho (21 March 1906 – 2 July 1974) was a Brazilian actor, violinist, mandolinist, banjo player, guitarist, pianist, composer and singer. He worked with some of Brazil's most notable performers of the 1930s including Carmen Miranda, Mário Reis and Noel Rosa.

Recordings
 1930 - Mamãezinha está dormindo
 1930 - Eu quero casar com você
 1930 - O meu amor tem
 1930 - Quando a noite desce (with Roberto Borges)
 1932 - Mulato de qualidade
 1931 - Bamboleô 
 1933 - Alô... Alô?
 1933 - Filosofia (with Noel Rosa)
 1934 - Cidade Maravilhosa
 1935 - S.O.S.
 1937 - Baiana do tabuleiro
 1937 - Primavera da vida (with Almanyr Grego)
 1941 - Cinzas no coração

References

Literature
 ALBIN, Ricardo Cravo (Criação e Supervisão Geral). Dicionário Houaiss Ilustrado da Música Popular Brasileira. Rio de Janeiro: Paracatu, 2006.
 MORAIS JUNIOR, Luis Carlos de. O Sol nasceu pra todos:a História Secreta do Samba. Rio de Janeiro: Litteris, 2011.

1906 births
1981 deaths
20th-century Brazilian male singers
20th-century Brazilian singers
20th-century Brazilian male actors
Brazilian violinists
Brazilian male guitarists
Brazilian pianists
Male actors from Rio de Janeiro (city)
Musicians from Rio de Janeiro (city)
20th-century violinists
20th-century pianists
20th-century guitarists
Brazilian banjoists
Male pianists